Hyde Park is a very wealthy suburb of Johannesburg, South Africa. It borders Illovo, Sandhurst, and Craighall Park. Hyde Park is located in Region B of the City of Johannesburg Metropolitan Municipality.

History
The suburb is named after London's esteemed Hyde Park area, and enjoys the same associations of prestige as its London counterpart. Hyde Park was declared a residential area in 1955, and has since become home to the top echelons of South African society. Its tree-lined streets and multi-acre estates with large and luxurious historic homes live side-by-side with their more modern security estate neighbours.

Economy
Virgin Atlantic has its South Africa office in Hyde Park.

References

Johannesburg Region B